Rajouri (or Rajauri) is a district of Jammu and Kashmir. The Line of Control lies to its west, Poonch to its north, the Reasi district to the east and the Jammu district to its south.  Rajouri is famous for its "Kalari" (made from milk). Representing an ancient principality, Rajouri was a joint district, along with Reasi, at the time of princely state's accession to India in 1947. The two tehsils were separated and Rajouri was merged with the Poonch district. Rajouri again became a separate district in 1968.

The Rajouri district comprises 13 tehsils (boroughs). The land is mostly fertile and mountainous. Maize, wheat and rice are the main crops of the area and the main source of the irrigation is the river Tawi that originates from the mountains of Pir Panjal.

Geography 

The Rajouri district is bordered on the west by Pakistans Kotli district, on the north by Indian-administered Kashmir part of the Poonch district, on the east by the Reasi district and on the south by Jammu district.

The northern parts of the Rajouri district are in the Pir Panjal range, especially the Thanamandi and Darhal tehsils. However, The Rajouri Tawi River (also called Naushera Tawi) and its many tributaries flow through the mountain valleys, making them habitable. The Ansi river similarly waters the Budhal tehsil.

In the south, there is a wide valley between the Tain Dhar and Kali Dhar ranges (part of the Outer Hills of Himalayas), which is called either Naushera valley or Lam-Khuiratta valley. In between these two ranges, there is a lower range called Koti Dhar, which divides the valley into two parts. The Line of Control between the Indian-administered and Pakistani-occupied Kashmir regions runs along the southern Kali Dhar range for part of the way and the Koti Dhar range for the rest.

The old Mughal Road into the Kashmir Valley used to come up from Bhimber, and pass through the Naushera and Rajouri towns to the Pir Panjal Pass. This is now cut off by the Line of Control. Also cut off is the roadway between Sunderbani and Kotli, which used to run in the Lam-Khuiratta valley.

History

Ancient history 
Rajouri, BhimberGali and Naushera were integrated within the territory of Abhisar, which was one of the hill states of the Punjab Kingdom. Early records of incomplete nature show that in the 4th century B.C.E., there existed in the north west of India a federal type of political set up in which Abhisar with its capital Rajouri was also incorporated. At the time of Alexander's invasion, Rajouri was at the summit of its splendour. In the Mauryan period, the town of Rajouri was a great trade centre.

Early modern history 
During the Mughal rule, the Muslim Jarral Rajput rulers or Raja agreed to a treaty with the Mughal Empire and thus, were given the title 'Raja' and 'Mirza'. Descendants of the Jarral Rajput Dynasty continue to use these titles. Albaruni visited Rajouri with Sultan Masud (Son of Sultan Mahmud) in 1036 C.E. In his book "India" he wrote name of Rajouri as Raja Vari. Srivar, the writer of 'Raj Tirangini' written during the administration of Sultan Zain-Ul-Abdin, also named this area as Raja Vari. It is believed that Raja Vari is a variant of Rajapuri. Mirza Zafarulla Khan, the writer of 'Tarikh Rajgan-E-Rajour' illustrated in his book that this place was in the beginning known as Raj-Avar and then altered from Rajour to Rajouri. But the old people in the villages still label the place as Rajour. With the course of time the name changed from Raja's Raj Avar to Raja Puri, Rajpuri to Raj Vari, Raj Vari to Raj Vara, Raj Vara to Raj Avar, Raj Avar to Rajour and then Rajour to Rajouri. As per Rajtirangini of Kalhan, Rajouri emerged as principality in about 1003 C.E. The first ruler of this kingdom was Raja Prithvi Paul. From 1033 to 1194 C.E. Raja Prithvi Paul defended Pir Panchal Pass at the time of incursion of Sultan Mehmud in 1021 C.E. Raja Sangram Paul safeguarded his Principality Rajouri when Raja Harash of Kashmir attacked his country in 1089 A.D. Sangram Paul fought so courageously that Raja Harash was obliged to return from Prithvi Paul fort without capturing Rajouri. Jaral Muslim Rajas rebuilt Rajouri city at the time of their rule. A number of forts, sarais, mosques and baradaris were constructed.

The area of Rajouri principality included proper Rajouri, Thanna, Bagla Azim Garh, Behrote, Chingus, Darhal, Nagrota and Phalyana etc.

Modern history 
In 1813, Gulab Singh of Jammu captured Rajouri for the Sikh Empire of Maharaja Ranjit Singh, by defeating Raja Agar Ullah Khan. After this, Rajouri became part of the Sikh Empre. But parts of it were given as jagirs to Rahim Ullah Khan (a half-brother of Agar Ullah Khan) and other parts to Gulab Singh.

Following the First Anglo-Sikh War and the Treaty of Amritsar (1846), all the territories between the Ravi River and the Indus were transferred to Gulab Singh, and he was recognised as an independent Maharaja of Jammu and Kashmir. Thus Rajouri became a part of the princely state of Jammu and Kashmir. Gulab Singh changed the name of Rajouri to Rampur. He appointed Mian Hathu as Governor of Rajouri, who remained in Rajouri up to 1856. Mian Hathu constructed a stunning temple in between Thanna Nallah in close proximity to Rajouri city. He also built Rajouri Fort at Dhannidhar village.

After Mian Hathu, Rajouri was transformed into a tehsil and affiliated with Bhimber district. In 1904, this tehsil was separated from Bhimber and affiliated with the Reasi district.

Partition 

 
After the Partition of India and the accession of Jammu and Kashmir to India in October 1947, there followed the First Kashmir War between India and Pakistan. The Pakistani raiders, along with the rebels and deserters from the western districts of the state, captured Rajauri on 7 November 1947. The 30,000 Hindus and Sikhs living in Rajauri were reportedly killed, wounded or abducted. Rajauri was recaptured on 12 April 1948 by the 19 Infantry Brigade of the Indian Army under the command of Second Lieutenant Rama Raghoba Rane. Rane, despite being wounded, launched a bold tank assault by conveying the tanks over the Tawi river bed in order to avoid the road blocks along the main road. When the Indian Army entered the town, the captors had fled, having destroyed most of the town and killing all its inhabitants. After the arrival of the Army, some 1,500 refugees that had fled to the hills, including women and children, returned to the town.

The ceasefire line at the end of the War ran to the west of the Rajouri district.

Inside India 
Soon after the war, the Rajouri and Reasi tehsils were separated. The Rajouri tehsil was merged with the Indian-administered Poonch district to form the Poonch-Rajouri district. The Reasi tehsil was merged with the Udhampur district.

On 1 January 1968, the two tehsils were reunited and the resulting district was named the Rajouri district.

The Reasi tehsil was also separated out in 2006 into a separate Reasi district. The present Rajouri district comprises the 1947 Rajouri tehsil.

Pakistan Air Force airstrike

On 27 February 2019, Pakistan air force (PAF) crossed the Line of Control (LoC) and carried out airstrikes against multiple targets in Rajouri District. Pakistan Air Force officials asserted that their target was supply depot of Indian military and had struck at 6 locations in Indian-administered Kashmir. PAF officials also claimed that they have successfully achieved their targets. Indian military officials confirmed that airstrike took place and had identified Narian, Lam Jhangar and Kerri in Rajouri district as the areas where the strike took place. They also claimed that the Hamiphur area of Bhimber Ghali in Poonch was also targeted. Indian military officials further stated that the bombs landed in deserted area and caused no damage. Indian army 25 division headquarters and ammunition and supply depot were targets of the airstrikes as per Indian military officials' claims.

2023 Rajouri Attacks

On 1 January 2023, some militants broke into three houses in Dangri village of Rajouri district and opened fire on civilians resulting into death of four and injuring many other. On 2 January 2023, an Improvised Explosive Device IED blasted near the same attack site which results into death of a minor child and injuring five people.

Organisation 
The Rajouri district comprises the subdistrict sunderbani, nowshera, Kotranka, kalakote & tehsils are Rajouri, Darhal, Sunderbani, Budhal, kotranka, khawas, Manjakote Nowshera, Thanamandi, and Kalakot.

There are 19 blocks: Rajouri, Darhal, kotranka Sunderbani, Doongi, Nowshera, Kalakote, Manjakote, Thanamandi and Budhal Dhangri, khawas, Lamberi, Moghla, Panjgrain,Plangar,Qila darhal,Rajnagar,Seri,Siot,. Each block consists of a number of panchayats.

During recent reviews conducted by administration. It is planned to construct 400/132kv & 400/220 kv station at Rajori to resolve the electrical power supply to the statved area of Rajouri, Poonch Mendhar. This Grid station will be based on latest GIS technology of electrical technology.

Rajouri has its own deemed University Baba Ghulam Shah Badshah University popularly known as BGSBU which offers various Diploma, UG and PG courses. It also has one Government Medical College GMC Rajouri along with other degree colleges.

Politics 
The district has four assembly constituencies: Nowshera, Darhal, Rajouri and Kalakote, and 14 district development council constituencies: Budhal New, Budhal Old-A, Budhal Old-B, Darhal, Dhangri, Doongi, Kalakote, Manjakote, Moughla, Nowshera, Rajouri, Seri, Sunderbani and Thanamandi. Rajouri District comes under Jammu-Rajouri-Poonch Lok Sabha Constituency.

Demographics 

According to the 2011 census Rajouri district has a population of 642,415. This gives it a ranking of 518th in India (out of a total of 640). Its population growth rate over the decade 2001–2011 was 28.14%. Rajouri has a sex ratio of 863 females for every 1000 males (which varies with religion), and a literacy rate of 68.54%.

Though Urdu and English are the main mediums of instruction, the main native languages are Pahari-Pothwari and Gujari. Pahari is mainly spoken by the Malik community that forms majority of Darhal Malkan. Gujari is mainly spoken by the Gujjar and Bakarwal which contribute much Muslim population of Rajouri. Kashmiri and Dogri are both spoken by small minorities.

See also
Ghari Momin
Azmatabad
Kalakote
2023 Rajouri Terror attacks

References

Bibliography

External links 
 Official website
 Rajouri Social Network
 Rajouri District marked on OpenStreetMap
 Rajouri Tehsil Map, MapsOfIndia, retrieved 25 November 2016.

 
Districts of Jammu and Kashmir